Anna Duncan may refer to:

 Anna Duncan, a fictional character from the BBC children's series Grange Hill. 
 Anna Duncan (née Denzler), one of the Isadorables